My Movie Channel (formerly Blink Cinema) was a 24-hour Filipino cable and satellite television network based in Shaw Boulevard, Mandaluyong. Owned by Solar Entertainment Corporation, It currently airs movies from Hollywood and around the world, while also airing entertainment news programs, talk shows and drama series.

History

January 2013: Blink Cinema

Blink Cinema was launched on January 3, 2013, with the full broadcast taking effect later that month.

November 2013: My Movie Channel
The channel was renamed as My Movie Channel on November 30, 2013, coinciding with the transfer of ETC to SBN and former sister channel Solar News Channel's move to RPN 9, as well as the launch of Solar's video-on-demand website Blink. On March 1, 2015, the channel replaced former sister channel TGC on various cable providers, following the latter's end of operations on February 28, 2015. After almost 2 years ago on broadcasting, My Movie Channel announced that they will ceased broadcasting on television effective June 30, 2015, and gave thanks to its viewers before they sign-off on July 1, 2015.

Programming
The channel's programming mainly consists of movies from major Hollywood film studios, while foreign films are aired on its weekly "World Cinema" block on weekdays. It also airs entertainment news programs, US talk shows, and US TV series, the latter of which are shown on its "Series at Six" block.

Final aired programs

U.S. TV series

Drama Series
Mr Selfridge
 NCIS

Talk Shows
 Inside the Actors Studio
 The Tonight Show Starring Jimmy Fallon
 The Tonight Show with Jay Leno

Entertainment News
 Entertainment Tonight
 The Insider

See also
Solar Entertainment Corporation
ETC
2nd Avenue
Movie Central

References

External links
My Movie Channel on Solar Entertainment Website

Defunct television networks in the Philippines
Former Solar Entertainment Corporation channels
Movie channels in the Philippines
English-language television stations in the Philippines
Television channels and stations established in 2013
Television channels and stations disestablished in 2015
2013 establishments in the Philippines
2015 disestablishments in the Philippines